PullApart was a UK-based, independent packaging recycling classification system. Applied at the kerbside, it combined environmental and consumer packaging surveys to provide customers with a measurement of the ease with which specific types of packaging could be locally recycled. The process was invented by Michael Butler of Dawlish in 2005, and operated for free.

Methodology
As PullApart was applied to existing local authority-installed recycling bin refuse collection systems, its scoring scheme was dependent on individual local authorities’ own packaging disassembly practices. Sample packaging was disassembled, according to the Local Authority’s process, rearranged and its components graded for ease of recycling. The raw information from this exercise was also made available to the public.

A final, consumer-oriented "PAC" (PullApart Code) score was achieved by measuring what proportion of a product's components was recyclable from the kerbside. The PAC score is represented by 13 stages of ‘traffic light’ grading.

Broader aims
PullApart’s stated aims are to encourage, manufactures, retailers, food and agricultural producers to give greater weight to the ease of disposal and recycling in their packaging designs. Weighting the consumers point of view equally to that of packaging manufactures, retailers and recyclers, in the handling of domestic waste products for kerbside collections. To provide consumers with information enabling product choice (ethical consumerism), that's easy, local and totally kerbside recyclable. Furnishing an unambiguous tool, that measures the differences between those mentioned above, assisting in the optimisation of products for the goal of near Zero waste.

According to PullApart’s then current Teignbridge (2011) survey of over 2000 products, 2.84% were ideally suited for kerbside recycling and a further 29.32% were good, whilst the rest failed. The sample area, Teignbridge, and therefore Teignbridge District Council, had a current recycling rate of 57% (2008/2009), (by weight). Quoting from their periodical, “Teignbridge Life” explaining to local people how PullApart worked: “The online packaging recycling guide features a free search function which classifies ordinary consumer products, like cereal boxes, with a 'PullApart' rating. The rating breaks the product down into its components, explaining which parts can be recycled in Teignbridge.”

Awards for the scheme
PullApart is considered to be of “Environmental Best Practice” by The Green Organisation.

Comparison with other efforts

Worldwide there are broader packaging scoring systems that address the full environmental impact of packaging. Recycling being one factor, other vital considerations include the use of recycled materials in the package, avoidance of toxic substances, minimization of packaging, effects on atmosphere (greenhouse gas, VOC, etc.), use of renewable resources, etc.   Efforts involve methodologies such as life cycle assessment to inventory the all environmental impacts and factors.
There are many Sustainability metrics and indices, some specifically for packaging.

See also

Landfill
Waste
Curbside collection
Recycling
Litter
Packaging and labeling
Source reduction
Environmentalism
Waste management
Greenwash
Triple bottom line
Sustainability brand
Sustainable packaging
Life Cycle Assessment
Carrying capacity
Consumerism
Ethical Consumer, the UK's leading alternative consumer organisation
Anti-consumerism
Fair trade
Green brands
Socially responsible investing

References

 "How pulling it apart is pulling them in", Herald Express, 17 July 2008

 "PullApart Remembered (a unique product packaging recycling survey). Part 1 (Flythrough of the fundamental features)." A video showing (in part), what PullApart looked like.

 "PullApart Remembered (a unique product packaging recycling survey). Part 2 (Flythrough of selected local bin collection types and recyclability categories.)." A video showing (in part), what PullApart looked like.

 "PullApart Remembered (a unique product packaging recycling survey). Part 3 (Flythrough of PullApart’s Calculator.)." A video showing (in part), what PullApart looked like.

Recycling
Waste collection
Packaging